The Fujifilm X-T5 is a mirrorless interchangeable-lens digital camera announced on November 2, 2022. It is the successor to 2020's X-T4 with improved autofocus, higher resolution and reduced body size. The 40.2 megapixels X-Trans 5 sensor is the highest-resolution APS-C sensor currently on the market.

Key features
The X-T5 is a mirrorless compact camera made by Fujifilm. It measures 130 mm x 91 mm x 64 mm and weighs 607 g including memory card and battery.
Mechanical dials are provided for key operations, including shutter speed, ISO sensitivity, exposure compensation, drive modes and metering modes. It lacks built-in flash, and does not include a flash unit.

 40.2 megapixels X-Trans CMOS 5 HR sensor.
 7-Stop 5-axis in-body image stabilization
 Weather resistant structure
 4K 120p, 6.2K 30p, FHD 240p 10-Bit Video
 425-Point Intelligent Hybrid AF System
 3.69m-Dot OLED Electronic Viewfinder
 3″ 1.84m-Dot Tilting Touchscreen LCD
 20 fps E. Shutter, 15 fps Mech. Shutter
 160MP Pixel Shift Multi-Shot
 Bluetooth and Wi-Fi Connectivity
 ProRes & Blackmagic RAW via HDMI

References

External links

X-T5
Cameras introduced in 2022